National Route 224 is a national highway of Japan connecting Tarumizu, Kagoshima and Kagoshima, Kagoshima(via Sakurajima) in Japan, 14.2 km (8.82 mi) in length.

References

224
Roads in Kagoshima Prefecture